Stieglitz is a crater on Mercury. Its name was adopted by the International Astronomical Union in 2012, after the American photographer Alfred Stieglitz.

Stieglitz is a complex crater, having a central peak.

The crater is within Borealis Planitia.  The crater Gaudí is due north of Stieglitz, and Strauss is to the southeast.

References

Impact craters on Mercury